Alan Murphy (1953–1989), English musician.

Al(l)an or Allen Murphy may also refer to:
Alan Murphy (hurler) (born 1996), Irish hurler
Allan Murphy, Canadian political candidate
Allen Murphy (born 1952), basketball player
Alan Murphy, in 2013 All-Ireland Minor Hurling Championship